Palasport Primo Carnera is an indoor sporting arena located in Udine, Italy.  The capacity of the arena is 3,850 people. It is currently home of the APU Udine basketball team. It is named after former world heavyweight boxing champion Primo Carnera, who was born in Sequals, near Udine.

The Palasport Primo Carnera will host many games of the 2017 FIBA Under-19 Women's Basketball World Cup, including the final.

References

Indoor arenas in Italy
Basketball venues in Italy
Buildings and structures in Udine
Sports venues in Friuli-Venezia Giulia